is a Japanese Super Robot anime series created by Knack Productions. It consisted of 26 episodes and originally aired from October 4, 1972, to March 28, 1973.

Plot
An alien woman named Maya crash-lands on Earth. Her homeworld was destroyed by the Blasters, a cruel alien race who steals the natural resources from other planets. She falls in love with a scientist and gives birth to a human boy named Kantaro. When the Blasters invade the Earth, Kantaro must defeat them by fighting with Astroganger, a robot made from living metal.

Production
This was the first Super Robot show in color, beating Mazinger Z to the air by two months.

Astroganger is very different from most of the robots of the genre. He is a sentient being who can talk, think, and feel pain. He has no special abilities and must rely on his strength to win battles.

Staff
 Series composition: Tatsuo Tamura
 Script: Tatsuo Tamura, Mitsuru Majima, Reiko Imano, Toyohiro Ando, Hiromichi Mogaki
 Storyboards: Taku Sugiyama, Masayuki Akehi
 Episode directors: Yoshikata Nitta, Kenjiro Yoshida

Reception
Astroganger was very popular in the Middle East as Jonker (جونكر), and was also shown in Italy as Astroganga and in Spain as Astro Gungar.

The same staff would go on to create the notorious Chargeman Ken!. Like that show, Astroganger has sometimes been referred to as "so bad it's good."

References

External links

1972 anime television series debuts
Discotek Media
Knack Productions
Nippon TV original programming
Super robot anime and manga